Steam is the second studio album by English boy band East 17. It was released in the UK on 13 October 1994 by London Records. The album was certified 2× Platinum in the UK.

The album spawned four UK top-10 hits, "Around the World" (No. 3), "Steam" (No. 7), "Let It Rain" (No. 10) and the UK Christmas No. 1, "Stay Another Day". The US version of the album added the three UK top-10 singles from their first album ("House of Love", "Deep" and "It's Alright").

Track listing

Notes
 signifies an additional producer

Charts

Weekly charts

Year-end charts

Certifications

References

External links
discogs.com East 17: Steam

1994 albums
East 17 albums
Albums produced by Richard Stannard (songwriter)